Russeifa, also spelled Russiefa,  is a city in Zarqa Governorate in Jordan. It had a population of 472,604 inhabitants in 2015, making it the fourth-largest city in Jordan, after Amman, Irbid, and Zarqa.

Geography
The city of Russeifa is located in the Central  region of Jordan, in the Zarqa River basin, on the Amman-Zarqa highway.  Amman, Zarqa, and Russeifa form one large metropolitan area, the second-largest metropolitan area in the Levant, after Damascus. Administratively, the city belongs to Zarqa Governorate.

Demographics
The Jordan National Census of 2004 showed the population of Russeifa as 268,237. The female to male ratio was 48.46% to 51.54%. Jordanian citizens made up 89.6% of Russeifa's population.

Districts of Metropolitan Russeifa 
The metropolitan area is divided into five districts as follows:

Economy
The city has been known for phosphate mining since 1935, when deposits were discovered by Amin Kamel Kawar. The Jordan Phosphate Mines company, founded by Kawar, operates and runs the phosphate mines in Russeifa. 

Many heavy industries are based in Russeifa due to its location between the two large cities of Amman and Zarqa, and due to the presence of the Zarqa River.

References

Populated places in Zarqa Governorate